This list identifies the military aircraft which are currently being operated or have formerly been operated by the Irish Air Corps.

Active Irish military aircraft
Military aircraft currently in active service with the Irish Air Corps are as follows:

Retired Irish military aircraft
A few examples of former Air Corps aircraft are retained in the Air Corps Museum in Baldonnel. These include an Avro Anson, An Alouette III and a Fouga Magister. A De Havilland Vampire and a Miles Magister are on display in the National Museum in Collins Barracks (Dublin).

Military aircraft which have been withdrawn from service with the Irish Air Corps include the following:

Fighter and attack aircraft 

Bristol F.2B Fighter - 8× 1922-1935
Martinsyde F.4 Buzzard - 4× 1922-1929
RAE S.E.5a - 1× 1922 (destroyed by the IRA during Civil War)
Bristol F.2B Fighter Mk II - 8× 1925-1935
Gloster Gladiator I - 4× 1938-1944 (1× crashed 1938, 1× crashed 1944, 2× retired 1943, 12 more ordered but not delivered during The Emergency)
Hawker Hurricane I - 12× 1940-1946 (1× RAF crash-landed in Ireland 1940 and repaired by Air Corps, 11× delivered 1943)
Hawker Hurricane IIa - 1× 1941-1943 (RAF force-landed in Ireland)  
Hawker Hurricane IIb - 1× 1941-1943 (RAF crash-landed in Ireland)
Hawker Hurricane IIc - 6× 1945-1947
Supermarine V.S. 506 Seafire LF.III - 12× 1947-1955

Bombers
De Havilland DH.9 - 6x 
Fairey Battle TT.I - 1x
Hawker Hind and Hind Trainer
Lockheed Hudson I (also used for maritime patrol duties)

Reconnaissance and patrol aircraft
CASA CN-235M-100
Cessna FR172H - 8× FR172H, 1× FR172K. Five FR172H remained in service until 2019.
Fairey IIIF Mk II 
Supermarine V.S. 236 Walrus I - 3x from 1939

Transport and liaison aircraft

Avro 652A Anson I and C19
Avro 626 Prefect (also served as a navigation trainer)
Hawker Siddeley HS.125-600B and -700B
Beechcraft Super King Air 200T
De Havilland DH.84 Dragon 2
De Havilland DH.104 Dove Mk 4, Mk 5, Mk 7, and Mk 8A
Grumman G1159A Gulfstream III (leased)
Gulfstream IV 
Hawker Hector
Martinsyde Type A Mk II 
Vickers Type 193 Vespa IV and Type 208 Vespa V
Westland Lysander II - x6

Trainer aircraft

Avro 504K - 6× 1922-1932
Avro 621 Tutor
Avro 631 Cadet (also used for coastal patrol duties)
Avro 636
De Havilland DH.60 Cirrus I Moth
De Havilland Canada DHC-1 Chipmunk T.20 and T.22A
De Havilland DH.115 Vampire T.55 - 6× 1956-1976
Fouga CM-170-2 Super Magister - 6× 1975-1999
Hunting Percival Provost T.51 and T.53
Miles M.14A Magister
Miles M.25 Martinet TT.I
Miles M.9A Master I and M.19 Master II
SIAI-Marchetti SF-260D and SF-260WE Warrior
Supermarine V.S. 509 Spitfire T.9 - 6× 1951-1961

Helicopters

Aérospatiale Alouette III - replaced by AW139s and retired in September 2007
Aérospatiale SA330J Puma - leased from Aerospatiale for 2 years during the early 1980s
Aérospatiale SA342L Gazelle - retired December 2005. Later sold
Aérospatiale SA365Fi Dauphin II - retired and sold
Sikorsky S-61N - Previously leased and operated by IAC for Search & Rescue/Coast Guard. Subsequently, returned to CHC Ireland who operated it in a similar capacity for the IRCG.
Eurocopter Twin Squirrel AS355N - Operated by IAC for Garda Air Support Unit until replaced by second EC135T in January 2008.

References

Notes

Sources

 

 
 
 

Irish Air Corps
Irish Air Corps Aircraft
Republic of Ireland-related lists
Military equipment of the Republic of Ireland